Pierre du Mage (also Dumage) (baptized 23 November 1674 – 2 October 1751) was a French Baroque organist and composer. His first music teacher was most likely his father, organist of Beauvais Cathedral. At some point during his youth Dumage moved to Paris and studied under Louis Marchand. He also befriended Nicolas Lebègue, who in 1703 procured for Dumage a position of organist of the Saint-Quentin collegiate church. In 1710 he was appointed titular organist of the Laon Cathedral. Due to strained relations with his superiors in the cathedral chapter, du Mage left on 30 March 1719, at the age of 45, and became a civil servant. He apparently neither played nor composed music professionally until his death.

Du Mage's only surviving work is Premier livre d'orgue, published in 1708. This collection is dedicated to the chapter of Saint Quentin. It contains a single Suite du premier ton: eight pieces in the traditional French forms: Plein jeu, Fugue, Trio, Tierce en taille, Basse de Trompette, Récit, Duo and Grand jeu. In the brief preface du Mage explains that these are his first works, and that he modelled them after the music of his former teacher Marchand. His music is, however, of very high quality, and entirely representative of French organ music of the period. Musicologists Félix Raugel and Willi Apel both singled out Dumage's Récit for its "delicate and gentle lyricism", and Apel also praised the Tierce en taille and the Grand jeu as particularly striking. A second livre d'orgue was presented in 1712 to the chapter of Laon Cathedral, but has never been found.

Notes

References
Apel, Willi. 1972. The History of Keyboard Music to 1700. Translated by Hans Tischler. Indiana University Press. . Originally published as Geschichte der Orgel- und Klaviermusik bis 1700 by Bärenreiter-Verlag, Kassel.

External links

Media: Plein jeu, Récit sur le nasard avec tremblant, Grand jeu

1674 births
1751 deaths
People from Beauvais
French Baroque composers
French classical organists
French male organists
French male classical composers
18th-century keyboardists
18th-century classical composers
18th-century French composers
18th-century French male musicians
17th-century male musicians
Male classical organists